Chydoridae is a family of water fleas in the order Anomopoda. There are more than 50 genera and 520 described species in Chydoridae. A lot of Chydoridae species are non-native species, many of which pose a great threat to aquatic ecosystems.

Genera
These 52 genera belong to the family Chydoridae:

 Acroperus Baird, 1843
 Alona Baird, 1850
 Alonella G. O. Sars, 1862
 Alonopsis G. O. Sars, 1862
 Alpinalona Alonso & Sinev, 2017
 Anchistropus G. O. Sars, 1862
 Anthalona van Damme, Sinev & Dumont, 2011
 Archepleuroxus Smirnov & Timms, 1983
 Armatalona Sinev, 2004
 Australochydorus Smirnov & Timms, 1983
 Biapertura Smirnov, 1971
 Bryospilus Frey, 1980
 Camptocercus Baird, 1843
 Celsinotum Frey, 1991
 Chydorus Leach, 1816
 Coronatella Dybowski & Grochowski, 1894
 Dadaya G. O. Sars, 1901
 Disparalona Fryer, 1968
 Dumontiellus Smirnov, 2007
 Dunhevedia King, 1853
 Ephemeroporus Frey, 1982
 Ephmeroporus
 Euryalona G. O. Sars, 1901
 Eurycercus Baird, 1843
 Extremalona Sinev & Shiel, 2012
 Geoffreya Kotov, Sinev & Berrios, 2010
 Graptoleberis G. O. Sars, 1862
 Indialona Petkovski, 1966
 Karualona Dumont and Silva-Briano, 2000
 Kisakiellus Sousa & Elmoor-Loureiro, 2018
 Kurzia Dybowski and Grochowski, 1894
 Leberis Smirnov, 1989
 Leydigia Kurtz, 1874
 Maraura Sinev & Shiel, 2008
 Matralona van Damme & Dumont, 2009
 Miralona Sinev, 2004
 Monope Smirnov & Timms, 1983
 Monospilus G. O. Sars, 1861
 Notoalona Rajapaksa and Fernando, 1987
 Ovalona van Damme & Dumont, 2008
 Oxyurella Dybowski and Grochowski, 1894
 Paralona Sramek-Husek, Straskraba and Brtek, 1962
 Parvalona Van Damme, Kotov & Dumont, 2005
 Peracantha Baird, 1843
 Picripleuroxus Frey, 1993
 Pleuroxus Baird, 1843
 Pseudochydorus Fryer, 1968
 Rak Smirnov & Timms, 1983
 Rheoalona Sinev, Tiang-Nga & Sanoamuang, 2017
 Rhynchochydorus Smirnov & Timms, 1983
 Rhynchotalona Norman, 1903
 Saycia Sars, 1904
 Tretocephala D.G.Frey, 1965

References

Further reading

 
 
 

Cladocera
Crustacean families
Taxa named by Thomas Roscoe Rede Stebbing